The rock and roll revival was a back-to-basics musical trend of the late 1960s and early 1970s, in a sort-of backlash against the heavier and psychedelic rock sounds then in vogue.

History

As the Sixties ended, several early rock and rollers like Little Richard, Chuck Berry, Jerry Lee Lewis, Carl Perkins, Bill Haley & His Comets and Bo Diddley, who had been out of fashion since the British Invasion, experienced a resurgence in popularity, performing their old hits to a mix of old and new fans. Rock and roll revival festivals became popular, and anticipated the "oldies show" package tours of later years.

Bo Diddley announced "I'm back and I'm feelin' fine" in his comeback single titled Bo Diddley 1969, released by Checker Records. Sha Na Na performed "At the Hop" at the Woodstock Festival in 1969, in the revival spirit.

John Lennon and Yoko Ono had a surprise hit album in 1970 with Live Peace in Toronto 1969, recorded at the Toronto Rock and Roll Revival in September 1969. Appearing on the spur of the moment, with a hastily assembled band (composed of Lennon, Ono, Eric Clapton, Klaus Voormann and Alan White), Lennon led off their set with familiar songs (like "Blue Suede Shoes" and "Money (That's What I Want)") that suited the mood of the program.

The popularity of the movement peaked with the release of the George Lucas film, American Graffiti, in 1972 with the soundtrack featuring rock and doo-wop hits from the late '50s and early '60s. By the mid-1970s, however, record sales of rock 'n' roll reissues and retro releases had greatly declined as the music industry turned its attention to other musical trends.

See also
 Wild Honey
 John Wesley Harding
 "Lady Madonna"
 Boogie rock
 Revivalist artist
 Roots rock
 Swing revival

References

Rock music genres
1960s in American music
1960s in British music
American styles of music
Nostalgia
Retro-style music